Emmaus is a settlement on the island of Saint John in the United States Virgin Islands.

References

Populated places in Saint John, U.S. Virgin Islands